On Top of the World is a 1936 British comedy film directed by Redd Davis and starring Betty Fields, Frank Pettingell and Leslie Bradley.

After her dog wins at the racetrack, a Lancashire mill worker (Fields) uses the winnings to start a soup kitchen for displaced workers during an industrial dispute, and then mediates between management and labour.

The film was reissued several times. The Monthly Film Bulletin  called the story "very naive"  and said it presented "an atmosphere of snobbery."  Other reviews ignored the political messages and stated "through the wit and sympathy of a woman is harmony and prosperity restored."

The film had originally been intended as a vehicle for Field's sister, Gracie Fields. The censor's approved the submitted concept stating "the dog racing part seems very improbably but no doubt Miss Gracie Fields will get away with it."

Cast
 Betty Fields - Betty Schofield
 Frank Pettingell - Albert Hicks
 Leslie Bradley - Jimmy Priestley
 Ben Field - Old Harry
 Wally Patch - Cardsharper
 Aileen Latham - Anne
 Fewlass Llewellyn - Soames
 Charles Sewell - Mr Preston

References

External links

1936 films
1936 comedy films
Films directed by Redd Davis
British comedy films
British black-and-white films
1930s English-language films
1930s British films